Heliopsis novogaliciana is a Mexican species of flowering plant in the family Asteraceae. It is native western Mexico in the Sierra Madre Occidental in the states of Jalisco, Nayarit, Sinaloa, Chihuahua and Durango.

References

novogaliciana
Flora of Mexico
Plants described in 1987